Dvorishche is a rural locality (a village) in Permasskoye Rural Settlement, Nikolsky District, Vologda Oblast, Russia. The population was 21 as of 2002.

Geography 
Dvorishche is located 34 km south of Nikolsk (the district's administrative centre) by road. Permas is the nearest rural locality.

References 

Rural localities in Nikolsky District, Vologda Oblast